Coleus cataractarum, synonym Plectranthus cataractarum, is a species of flowering plant in the family Lamiaceae. It is found in Cameroon and Equatorial Guinea. Its natural habitats are subtropical or tropical moist lowland forests and rivers, near waterfalls. It is threatened by habitat loss.

References

cataractarum
Flora of Cameroon
Flora of Equatorial Guinea
Vulnerable plants
Taxonomy articles created by Polbot
Taxobox binomials not recognized by IUCN